Mikayil Jabrailov (April 27, 1952, Shaki, Azerbaijan – December 15, 1990, Khojaly, Azerbaijan) was the National Hero of Azerbaijan, and the warrior of the First Nagorno-Karabakh War.

Biography 
Mikayil Jabrayilov was born on April 27, 1952, in Okhud village of Shaki region, in the family of the legendary partisan French national hero Ahmediyya Jabrayilov in the Second World War. He started his secondary school in the village of Okhud. He was appointed as a militia officer in Sheki City Internal Affairs Department.

Military activities 
On December 12, 1990, Mikail Jabrailov who was a senior police lieutenant was sent to Karabakh with his police officers. Their task was to protect the village of Jamilli which belonged to the Republic of Azerbaijan.

Once, when he was in the village, he went to bring some cereals to the residents of the village with his police officers. Suddenly, the Armenian soldiers attacked them on the road between the Dzhamilli and Kosalar. One of the officers was seriously wounded by the sniper bullet. Mikayil got shot on his shoulders. Nevertheless, Mikayil continued his fight and when he tried to rescue his captured soldiers on December 15, 1990, he got killed in the battlefield.

He was married and had one child.

Memorial 
Mikayil Jabrailov was posthumously awarded the title of "National Hero of Azerbaijan" by the decree of the President of the Republic of Azerbaijan No 831 of 6 June 1992.

He was buried in Okhud village of Shaki region. There is a street in Shaki on behalf of Mikayil Jabrailov. The village of Mikayilli, where he was killed, is named after him.

See also 
 List of National Heroes of Azerbaijan
 First Nagorno-Karabakh War

References

Sources 
Vüqar Əsgərov. "Azərbaycanın Milli Qəhrəmanları" (Yenidən işlənmiş II nəşr). Bakı: "Dərələyəz-M", 2010, səh.56-57.

1952 births
1990 deaths
Azerbaijani military personnel
Azerbaijani military personnel of the Nagorno-Karabakh War
Azerbaijani military personnel killed in action
National Heroes of Azerbaijan
People from Shaki, Azerbaijan